Formentera is the eighth studio album by Metric. It was released on July 8, 2022, through Metric Music International and Thirty Tigers, and was supported by the singles "All Comes Crashing", "Doomscroller", and "What Feels Like Eternity".

Critical reception

Formentera received a score of 79 out of 100 based on ten critics' reviews, on review aggregator Metacritic, indicating "generally favorable" reception.

Track listing

Charts

References

2022 albums
Metric (band) albums
Thirty Tigers albums